was a Japanese rower. He competed in the men's coxed four at the 1936 Summer Olympics.

References

External links

1916 births
Possibly living people
Japanese male rowers
Olympic rowers of Japan
Rowers at the 1936 Summer Olympics
Place of birth missing